Wimmeranthus is a genus of flowering plants belonging to the family Campanulaceae.

Its native range is Southwestern Mexico.

Species:
 Wimmeranthus inopinatus Rzed.

References

Campanulaceae
Campanulaceae genera